Elgin State Bank was a bank headquartered in Elgin, Illinois. In 2011, the bank was acquired by Wintrust Financial for $13.75 million in cash and stock and its branches were re-branded as St. Charles Bank & Trust Company.

The bank had 3 branches, all of which were in Elgin, Illinois.

History
The bank was founded in 1964.

On September 9, 2010, the Federal Deposit Insurance Corporation issued an order against the bank, citing "unsafe or unsound banking practices".

In 2011, the bank was acquired by Wintrust Financial for $13.75 million in cash and stock and its branches were re-branded as St. Charles Bank & Trust Company.

References

Banks established in 1964
Banks disestablished in 2011
Defunct banks of the United States
1964 establishments in Illinois
Companies based in Elgin, Illinois